The following is a list of films featuring the sport of athletics, including track and field.

List

See also
List of sports films
List of highest grossing sports films 

List
Films
Athletics